Edwyn E. Mason (February 6, 1913 – July 9, 2003) was an American lawyer and politician from New York.

Life
He was born on February 6, 1913, in De Peyster, St. Lawrence County, New York. He attended school and high school in Ogdensburg. He graduated B.Sc. from Oswego State Teachers College in 1938. He graduated from Albany Law School, was admitted to the bar, and practiced law in Hobart, Delaware County, New York.In 1941, he married Melva Bettinger, and they had two children.

Mason was a member of the New York State Assembly from 1953 to 1972, sitting in the 169th, 170th, 171st, 172nd, 173rd, 174th, 175th, 176th, 177th, 178th and 179th New York State Legislatures. He was an alternate delegate to the 1960 Republican National Convention.

He was a member of the New York State Senate from 1973 to 1978, sitting in the 180th, 181st and 182nd New York State Legislatures. Afterwards he moved to Zephyrhills, Florida.

He died on July 9, 2003, in Zephyrhills, Florida.

References

1913 births
2003 deaths
People from St. Lawrence County, New York
Republican Party New York (state) state senators
Republican Party members of the New York State Assembly
State University of New York at Oswego alumni
Albany Law School alumni
People from Hobart, New York
People from Zephyrhills, Florida
20th-century American politicians